Dankaur station is  a small residential area in the Gautam Budh Nagar district of Uttar Pradesh, India.

there are two markets on the both sides of station.

Yamuna express highway 

This is the longest (8 lanes) highway in India. It joins Delhi to Agra. A city named Jaypee Greens is under construction in this area. This city will be the world's longest city in area after New York City.

Facilities and upcoming projects 

 Yamuna Express Highway
 Golf course
 Night safari
 f1 Race track
 NTPC

 World class school and colleges
Metro train

Education

 Government school inter college
 Primary school
 Dharm public school
 Kasturi deevi public school
 Agriculture college

Transport

 Direct bus from ISBT Delhi to Mirzapur Niloni.
 Mirzapur Niloni to Noida and Greater Noida
 Mirzapur Niloni to Rabupura
 Mirzapur Niloni to Agra
 Auto service from Dankaur to Mirzapur Niloni
 Bus servies mirzapur to pari chowk

Health

 Homeopathic dispensary
 Child care centre (Government)
 Animal hospital

Nearby villages
Rampur Bangar Thakur Satpal Singh
Niloni
Acheja
Makanpur
Bhatta
Parsol
Reilkha
Roneja
Saiypur
Bhunna

Markets

 Garments shop
 Senatory shop
 Agricultural
 Carpentery
 Welders

Temple

A temple of Shiva is in the village.

A second temple of Mohan Baba is in the village.

References

 wikimapia.org/11995036/dharam-public-school-mirzapur-niloni
 yamunaexpresswayauthority.com/notifiedvillages
 www.hindustantimes.com/F1...track...Greater-Noida/Article1-257811..
 villages.ws/india/uttar_pradesh/.../mirzapur_dankaur_0059880.htm

Villages in Gautam Buddha Nagar district, Uttar Pradesh, India

Villages in Gautam Buddh Nagar district
Cities and towns in Gautam Buddh Nagar district